Francesco De Bonis (born 14 April 1982 in Isola del Liri) is an Italian former professional road cyclist. In 2008 he won the fourth stage and the mountains classification of the Tour de Romandie. He also rode in the 2009 Giro d'Italia, finishing 79th overall.

On 27 May 2010, based on discrepancies in his biological passport, De Bonis was suspended for two years by the Italian Olympic Committee after a request from the International Cycling Union.

Major results

2007
 1st GP Folignano
 1st Trofeo Internazionale Bastianelli
2008
 Tour de Romandie
1st  Mountains classification
1st Stage 4

References

External links 

1982 births
Living people
People from Isola del Liri
Cyclists from Lazio
Italian male cyclists
Doping cases in cycling
Italian sportspeople in doping cases
Sportspeople from the Province of Frosinone